Eurocon is an annual science fiction convention held in Europe. The organising committee of each Eurocon is selected by vote of the participants of the previous event. The procedure is coordinated by the European Science Fiction Society. The first Eurocon was held in Trieste, Italy, in 1972. Unlike Worldcons, Eurocon is usually a title attached to an existing convention. The European SF Awards are given in most of the conventions giving recognition to the best works and achievements in science fiction.

List of Eurocons

European SF Awards
The European SF Awards are annual awards governed by the European Science Fiction Society. since 1972 mostly during Eurocons. The awards are given to works of fiction (science fiction or fantasy) or related to that field.

Rules 
1. Must be a work of Science Fiction or Fantasy, or related to Science Fiction or Fantasy;
2. The majority of the work is by a person or a group of people who were born in, or are a citizen of, a European Country;
3. The works were first released in the two calendar years prior to the year of the current Eurocon;
4. If a work has won an ESFS Achievement award, it can not be nominated again in the same category.

Current annual awards
As of 2020, the following are awarded each year:

Special Awards
 The Chrysalis Awards
 The Achievement Awards
 The Hall of Fame
 The European Grandmaster

Achievement Award categories 
 Best work of Art
 Best written work of Fiction
 Best Dramatic Presentation
 Best Fanzine
 Best Work for Children
 Best Internet Publication, other than a fanzine

Hall of Fame Award categories 
Winners can only be admitted once.
 Best Artist
 Best Author
 Best Publisher
 Best Promoter of Science Fiction
 Best Magazine
 Best Translator

List of Awards given by convention

1972 European SF Awards: Trieste, Italy 
The first Eurocon was in Trieste.

The first Eurocon Awards were originally given as prizes to works presented at the convention itself.  Years later they evolved into awards as they are commonly known relating to European authors and publications.

Special awards
Artist: Karel Thole (Italy)
Specialized Professional Magazine: Nueva Dimensión (Spain)
Non-Specialized Professional Magazine: Viata Romaneasca (Romania)
Fanzine: Speculations (United Kingdom)
Comics: Lone Sloane, by Philippe Druillet (France)

Awards 
Novel:
Belgium - Sam, Paul Van Herck;
France - Ortog et les tenebres, Kurt Steiner;
Hungary - A Feladat, Peter Zsoldos;
Italy - Autocrisi, Pierfrancesco Prosperi;
Netherlands - De Naakten en de Speyers, Jacob Carossa;
Romania - Va cauta untaur, Sergiu Farcasan;
Spain - Amor en una Isla Verde, Gabriel Bermudez;
Sweden - Deta ar Verkligheten, Bertil Matensson;
United Kingdom - All Judgement Fled, James White;

Short Story:
Belgium - De 8 jaarlijkse God Eddy C. Bertin;
France - L'Assassinat de l'Oiseau Bleu, Daniel Walther;
Hungary - Sempiternin, Lajos Mesterhazi;
Italy - Dove Muore l'Astragalo, Livio Horrakh;
Netherlands - Egeïsche Zee Carl Lans;
Romania - Altarul Zeilor Stohastici Adrian Rogoz;
Sweden - Spranget, Carl Johan Holzhausen;
United Kingdom - Lucifer, Edwin Charles Tubb;

Dramatic Production:
Denmark - Man Den, Der Tankte Ting (Film);
Italy - La Ragazza di Latta (The Tin Girl) by Marcello Aliprandi (Film);
Netherlands - De Kleine Mannetjes van Mars (Radiophonic play for children);
Sweden - Deadline (Film);
United Kingdom - UFO (TV series);

Artist:
France - Jean-François Jamoul;
Hungary - Andras Miklos Saros;
Netherlands - N. van Welzenes;
Romania - Nicolae Saftoiu;
Spain - Enrique Torres (Enric);
Sweden - Sven O. Gripsborn;
United Kingdom - Arthur Thompson (Atom);

Specialized Professional Magazine: Spain - Galassia
Non-Specialized Professional Magazine:
Belgium - Ciso - SF & Comics;
France - Le Magazine Litteraire: La Science-Fiction;
Italy - Fena rete: Fantascienza & Futuribile;
Netherlands - Stripschrift: SF & Comics;
Spain - Yorick: Teatro y Ciencia-Ficcion;

Fanzine:
Austria - Quarber Merkur;
Belgium - Kosmos;
France - Nyarlathotep;
Hungary - SF Tajekoztato;
Italy - Notiziario CCSF;
Netherlands - Holland-SF;
Romania - Solaris;
Spain - Fundacion;
Sweden - SF Forum;
Turkey - Antares;

Comics:
Belgium - Yoko Tsuno, R. Leloup;
Netherlands - Arman en Ilva, The Tjong King;
Spain - Haxtur, Victor de la Fuente;
Sweden - Blixt Gordon, Lars Olsson;

Essay, biography, bibliography:
Hungary - A Fantazia Irodalma, Laszlo Urban;
Netherlands - 100 jaar SF in Nederland, Dick Scheepstra;
Romania - Virsta de Aur an Anticipatiei Romanesti, Ion Hobana;
Spain - La SF: Contramitologia del Siglo XX, Carlo Frabetti (Essay);
Ray Bradbury-Humanista del Futuro, Jose Luis Garci (Book);
Sweden - SF Articles in 'Sydsvenska Dagbladet', Sven Christer Swahn;

1974 European SF Awards: Grenoble, France

1976 European SF Awards: Poznań, Poland

Belgium - Jacques van Herp
Bulgaria - Liuben Dilov
Denmark - Jannick Storn
France - Gerard Klein
German Democratic Republic - Gerhardt Brandstner
Hungary - Peter Zsoldos
Italy - Karel Thole
Norway - Peter Harris
Poland - Czesław Chruszczewski
Romania - Vladimir Colin
Soviet Union - Yeremey Parnov
Spain - Miguel Masriera
Sweden - Roland Aldenberg
United Kingdom - Brain W. Aldiss
West Germany - Herbert W. Franke
Yugoslavia - Ivan Lalic
Netherlands - Bruna Publishing House
Belgium - Ides et Autres (anthologies of translations)
Czechoslovakia - Interpress Magazin

Special Awards 
Lifelong Literary Achievement: Stanisław Lem (Poland)
Artistic Achievement: Alexei Leonov (for his cosmic paintings)
Special Award from the Jury: Mircea Opriţă (Romania) (special award of the jury)

1978 European SF Awards: Brussels, Belgium

Science Fiction Awards 
Series: Ailleurs et demain Robert Laffont (France)
Anthology: Planete socialiste Kesselring (Switzerland)
Novel: Les hauteurs beantes Alexandru Zinoviev (Soviet Dissident)
Collection: Low-Flying Aircraft J. G. Ballard (United Kingdom)
Professional Magazine: Futurs (France)
Semi-Professional Magazine: Orbit (Netherlands)
Fanzine: Zikkurath (Spain)
Essay: Le frontiere dell'ignoto Vittorio Curtoni (Italy)
Cycle of Novels: La Saga de los Aznar George H. White (Spain)
Artist: Chris Foss (United Kingdom)
Comics: Mailis Claude Auclair (France)
Film: The Man Who Fell to Earth by Nicolas Roeg (United Kingdom)
Play: Sodomaquina Carlo Frabetti (Spain)
Translator: Zoran Zivkovic (Yugoslavia)

Fantastic & Fantasy Award 
Publisher: Marabout (Belgium)
Anthologists: Jacques Goimard & Roland Stragliati (France)
Novel: The Forbidden Forest Mircea Eliade (Romania)
Collection: Derrière le mur blanc Eddy C. Bertin (Belgium)
Professional Magazine: Terzo Occhio (Italy)
Semi-Professional Magazine: Cahiers Jean Ray (Belgium)
Fanzine: Odyssée (Belgium)
Essay: Un nouveau fantastique Jean Pierre Baronian (Belgium)
Cycle of Novels: Bob Morane Henri Vernes (Belgium)
Artist: Gaston Bogaert (Belgium)
Comics: Il dono Roberto Bonadimani (Italy)
Film Actor: Paul Naschy (Spain)
Playwright: Sławomir Mrożek (Poland)
Translator: Roberta Rambelli (Italy)

1980 European SF Awards: Stresa, Italy

Novel: The White Dragon Anne McCaffrey (United Kingdom); Babel Vladimir Colin (Romania)
Story: Der Rote Kristallplanet Gerd Maximovic (West Germany); Evadarea lui Algemon Gheorghe Sasarman (Romania)
Artist: Franco Storchi (Italy); Roger Dean (United Kingdom)
Publisher: Editrice Nord (Italy); Krajowa Agencja Wydawnicza (KAW) (Poland)
Fanzine: SF...ere (Italy); Omicron (Romania)
Film: Scontri stellari oltre la terza dimensione (Starcrash) by Luigi Cozzi (Italy); Čovjek koga treba ubiti by Veljko Bulajić (Yugoslavia)
Comics: Rosa di stelle Roberto Bonadimani (Italy); In lumea lui Harap Alb Sandu Florea (Romania)

Special Awards 
Author: John Brunner (United Kingdom); Stanisław Lem (Poland)
Artist: Karel Thole (Italy)
Essay: 20.000 pagine alla ricerca di Jules Verne Ion Hobana (Romania); Lovecraft S. Fusco & G. de Turris (Italy)
Fan: Waldemar Kumming (West Germany); Andrzej Pruszyński (Poland)
Best Artwork Exhibited: Oliviero Berni (Italy)

1982 European SF Awards: Mönchengladbach, West Germany

Author: Arkady and Boris Strugatsky (Soviet Union); Jacques Sadoul (France); John Brunner (United Kingdom)
Professional Magazine: Antares (France)
Fanzine: Shards of Babel (Netherlands)
Publisher: Heyne (West Germany); KAW (Poland)

1983 European SF Awards: Ljubljana, Yugoslavia

Author: Istvan Nemere (Hungary); Christopher Priest (United Kingdom)
Professional Magazine: Fantastyka (Poland); Solaris (West Germany)
Book: Ljudju, zvezde, vesolja – Bajt (Yugoslavia); Sdvig – Scherbakov (Soviet Union)
Fanzine: Shards of Babel (Netherlands); Kvazar (Poland)
Publisher: Tehniska Zalozba Slovenije (Yugoslavia); Galaktika (Bulgaria)

1984 European SF Awards: Brighton, United Kingdom (SeaCon'84) 
Special Award: Science in SF Nicholls, Langford and Stableford (United Kingdom); Centre International pour documentation sur la literature de l'etrange (Belgium); Yeremey Parnov (Soviet Union)
Novelist: John Brunner (United Kingdom); Gianluigi Zuddas (Italy); Janusz Zajdel (Poland)
Short Story Writer: J. G. Ballard (United Kingdom); A. de Ceglie (Italy); Kir Bulychev (Soviet Union)
Artist: D. Hardy (United Kingdom); G. Festino (Italy); R. Wojtyński (Poland)
Publisher: Gollancz (United Kingdom); Fleuve Noir (France); Mir (Soviet Union)
Professional Magazine: Foundation (United Kingdom); Fiction (France); Sirius (Yugoslavia)
Fanzine: Epsilon (United Kingdom); Andromeda Nachrichten (West Germany); Helion (Romania)
Screenwriter:  (West Germany); Chinghiz Aitmatov (Soviet Union)
Film Director: Piotr Szulkin (Poland); Marcell Jankovics (Hungary)

1986 European SF Awards: Zagreb, Yugoslavia (Ballcon) 
Special Award: Iskry (Poland); Solfanelli Editore (Italy)
Magazine: Urania (Italy); Sirius (Yugoslavia); Fantastika (Poland); Galaktika (Hungary); Jules Verne Magazinet (Sweden);  Zápisník (Czechoslovakia)
Fanzine: La Spada Spezzata (Italy); Fikcje (Poland); Ikarie XB (Czechoslovakia)
Publisher: Heyne Verlag (Germany); Gollancz (United Kingdom); Denoël (France); Alfa (Poland); Mora (Hungary); Fanucci (Italy)
Editor: Wolfgang Jeschke (Germany); Jacques Sadoul (France); Peter Kuczka (Hungary); Sandro Pergameno (Italy); Adam Hollanek (Poland)
Television: Bogdanoff
Posthumous: Julia Verlanger; Janusz Zajdel

1987 European SF Awards: Montpellier, France

Bulgaria 
Author: Liubomor Nikolov (for the novel Earthform in the Summerwind)
Artist: Rumen Urumov

France 
Lifelong Literary Achievement: Michel Jeury
Collection: Yves Fremion (for collection of stories Reves du sable, chateaux de sang
Comic: Pierre Christin & Jean-Claude Mézières (for comics series Valerian)
Series: Ailleurs et demain - Edited by Gerard Klein ("Robert Laffont")

German Democratic Republic 
Lichtjahr - almanac edited by Eric Simon

Hungary 
Author: Miklos Monus (for the novel He and It)
Artist: Csaba Jancso (for graphic work)
Publisher: Nepszava Publishing House
Fanzine: Metamorphozis

Italy 
Author: Renato Pestriniero (for the novel Il nido al di la dell'ombra)
Series: Cosmo Argento - Edited by Piergiorgio Nicolazzini ("Editrice Nord")
Magazine: Dimensione Cosmica
Translations: Annarita Guarnieri

Poland 
Lifelong Literary Achievement: Wiktor Żwikiewicz
Publisher: Iskry Publishing House
Fanzine: Feniks

Portugal 
Author: João Aniceto (for the novel O desafio)
Essay: Alvaro de Sousa Holstein Ferreria & Joao Manuel Morais for their Bibliografia da Ficcão Científica e Fantasia Portuguesa
Series: Contacto, edited by Joao Manuel Barreiros (Gradiva)

Romania 
Lifelong Literary Achievement: Victor Kembach
Author: Cristian Tudor Popescu (for his short stories)
Series: Fantastic Club, series ("Albatros")
Anticipația almanac published by the magazine Știința și tehnica
Fanzine: Paradox

Soviet Union (USSR) 
Lifelong Literary Achievement: Arkady and Boris Strugatsky
Author: Vitali Babenko (for his short stories)
TV-Series: Cosmonaut Gherghi Gretchko, for the TV-series Fantastic World
Publisher: Detskaia Literatura Publishing House
Magazine: Prostor
Translation: Maria Ossintseva

Spain 
Fanzine: Transito

1988 European SF Awards: Budapest, Hungary

1989 European SF Awards: San Marino

Bulgaria 
Lifelong Literary Achievement: Vessella Lutzkanova
Artist: Plamen Avramov
Magazine: FEP ("Fantastika, Evristika, Prognostika")

Finland 
Author: Karl Nenonen
Publisher: Ursa Publishing House
Magazine: Portti

Hungary 
Lifelong Literary Achievement: Laszlo Lorincze
Author: Hugo Preyer (for the novel Galaktikai jatekom)
Artist: Ivan Marko
Publisher: Vega Publishing House
Magazine: Elixir

Italy 
Lifelong Literary Achievement: Lino Aldani
Lifelong Artistic Achievement: Karel Thole
Promoter: Ernesto Vegetti
Publisher: Marino Solfanelli Publishing House
Magazine: Urania

Poland 
Critic: Andrzej Niewiadowski
Artist: Dariusz Chojnacki
Publisher: Alfa Publishing House
The editorial staff of the magazines Fantasyka, MalaFantasyka, Fantasyka Comics

Portugal 
Author: Romeu de Melo
Publisher: Livros do Brasil (for Argonauta series)

Romania 
Lifelong Literary Achievement: Vladimir Colin
Artist: Traian Abruda & Cornel Ionicelli
Critic: Cornel Robu (for critical edition of Victor Anestin's work)
Magazine: Romanian Review (for the issue dedicated to Romanian SF)
Fanzine: Helion

Soviet Union (USSR) 
Author & Screen Writer: Karen Shahnasarov
Publisher: Sovetscaia Rossia Publishing House

Spain 
Author: Carlos Cidoncha
Fanzine: Berserkr

Yugoslavia 
Artist: Igor Kordey
Bibliography: Zivko Prodanovich (for his SF Bibliography in Braille)

1990 European SF Awards: Fayence, France
Hall of Fame
Best Author: Romulus Barbulescu & George Anania (Romania)
Best Artist: Philippe Druillet (France)
Best Publisher: Wiktor Bukato (Poland)
Best Magazine: Ikarie (Czechoslovakia)
Best Promoter: Boris Zavgorodni (USSR)

Encouragement Awards
Czechoslovakia: Martin Zhouf
France: Bernard Simonay
Hungary: Joszef Nemeth
Romania: Mihail Gramescu
USSR: Lukin Couple

1991 European SF Awards: Kraków, Poland (CraCon/PolCon)
Hall of Fame
Best Author: Stanisław Lem (Poland)
Best Artist: Kája Saudek (Czechoslovakia)
Best Publisher: Unwin/Hyman (United Kingdom)
Best Magazine: Interzone (United Kingdom)
Best Promoter: Kees van Toorn (Netherlands)

Encouragement Awards
Belgium - Johan Desseyn
Bulgaria - Val Todorov
Czechoslovakia - Vilma Kadlečková
Germany - Maria J. Pfamnholz
Italy - Daniele Vecchi
Lithuania - Evaldas Livthevicius
Netherlands - Paul Harland
Romania - Alexandru Ungureanu (new writer)
United Kingdom - Eric Brown
USSR - Andrei Lazarchuk
Romania - Tudor Popa (new artist)

Special Achievement Award
Piotr W. Cholewa and Piotr "Raku" Rak - acknowledging their work for international fandom

1992 European SF Awards: Freudenstadt, Germany (FreuCon XII) 
Hall of Fame
Best Author: Arkady and Boris Strugatsky (Russia)
Best Artist: Teodor Rotrekl (Czechoslovakia)
Best Publisher: Wilhelm Heyne Verlag (Germany)
Best Magazine: Foundation (United Kingdom)
Best Promoter: Alexandre Hlinka & Vladimír Veverka (Czechoslovakia)

Encouragement Award
Romania - Danut Ungureanu

1993 European SF Awards: Saint Helier, Jersey (Helicon) 
Hall of Fame
Best Author: Iain Banks (United Kingdom)
Best Artist: Jim Burns (United Kingdom)
Best Publisher: Phantom Press International (Poland)
Best Magazine: Anticipatia (Romania)
Best Promoter: Larry van der Putte (Netherlands)

Spirit of Dedication Awards
Best Fanzine: BEM (Spain)
Best Work of Art: Gilles Francescano (France)

Encouragement Awards
Belgium: Fons Boelanders
France: Jean Pierre Planque
Hungary: G. Nagy Pal
Italy: Paolo Brera
Norway: Cato Sture
Poland: Radosław Dylis
Russia: Vasily Zvygintsev
Slovakia: Josef Zamay
Spain: Paco Roca
Ukraine: Ludmilla Kozinets
United Kingdom: Sue Thomas

1994 European SF Awards: Timișoara, Romania 
Hall of Fame
Best Author: Boris Shtern (Ukraine)
Best Artist: Dimitre Iankov (Bulgaria)
Best Publisher: Nemira (Romania) +
Best Magazine: Jurnalul SF (Romania)
Best Promoter: Cornel Secu (Romania)

Honorary Award
Ivailo Runev (Bulgaria - post mortem)

Spirit of Dedication Awards
Best Fanzine: The Science Fact & Science Fiction Concatenation; (United Kingdom)
Best Performance: Adrian Budritzan's Laser Show (Romania)
Best Work of Art: Tudor Popa (Romania)

Encouragement Awards
Bulgaria: Christo Poshtakov (new author)
Finland: Risto Isomaki (new author)
United Kingdom: Jeff Noon (new author)
Ukraine: Lev Vershenen (new author)
Romania: Tudor Popa (new artist)

Special Prize
Alexandru Mironov (Romania) – for his contribution to EuROCon '94

1995 European SF Awards: Glasgow, Scotland
53rd World Science Fiction Convention Intersection; the event was also the 1995 Worldcon.

Hall of Fame
Best Author: Alain le Bussy (Belgium)
Best Artist: Juraj Maxon (Slovakia)
Best Publisher: Babel Publications (Netherlands)
Best Magazine: Andromeda Nachrichten (Germany)
Best Promoter: Jaroslav Olša, Jr. (Czech Republic)

Encouragement Award
Sebastian A. Corn (Romania)

1996 European SF Awards: Vilnius, Lithuania (Lituanicon)
Hall of Fame
Best Author: Andrzej Sapkowski (Poland)
Best Artist: Denis Martynets (Ukraine)
Best Publisher: Eridanas (Lithuania)
Best Magazine: Alien Contact (Germany)
Best Promoter: Gediminas Beresnevicius (Lithuania)
Best Translator: Aleksander Scherbakov (Russia)

Spirit of Dedication Award
Best Fanzine: SF-Journalen (Sweden - ed. Ahrvid Engholm)

Encouragement Awards
Marian & Sergei Diachenko (Ukraine)
George Ceausu (Romania)

Special Prize
Igor Shaganov (Ukraine)

1997: Dublin, Ireland (Octocon)

1999: Dortmund, Germany (Trinity)

2000: Gdańsk, Poland (Tricity 2000)

2001: Capidava, Romania (Atlantykron)

2002: Chotěboř, Czech Republic (ParCon)

2003: Turku, Finland (Finncon)

2004: Plovdiv, Bulgaria (BulgaCon)

2005: Glasgow, Scotland 
Event celebrated the 63rd World Science Fiction Convention Interaction and was also that year's Worldcon.

2006: Kyiv, Ukraine

2007: Copenhagen, Denmark

2008: Moscow, Russia (Roscon / Interpresscon) 
Roscon / Interpresscon guests of honour

2009: Fiuggi, Italy (Deepcon 10)

2010: Cieszyn, Poland and Český Těšín, Czech Republic (PolCon/ParCon)
The PolCon/ParCon combined event was organized jointly by Czech, Polish, and Slovak fandoms.

2011: Stockholm, Sweden (and Swecon)

2012: Zagreb, Croatia 
Hall of Fame
Best Author: Ian McDonald (UK)
Best Artist: Nela Dunato (Croatia)
Best Translator: Pavel Weigel (Czech Republic)
Best Promoter: SF Encyclopedia Online Team (UK)
Best Publisher: , Éditions Robert Laffont (France)
Best Magazine:  (France)
Best Dramatic Presentation: Divadelní Spolek Kašpar (Czech Republic), for its adaptation of Daniel Keyes’s novella Flowers for Algernon
Best Website: Science Fact and Science Fiction Concatenation (UK)
Best artist: Zdenko Bašić (Croatia)
Best fanzine: Eridan (Croatia)

Honorary Award
Jean Giraud aka Moebius (France)

Honorary Award – European Grand Master
Brian Aldiss (UK)

Encouragement Awards 
Oleksandra Ruda (Ukraine)
Katarina Brbora (Croatia)
Istvan Marki (Hungary)
Illy Tyo (Russia)
Aleš Oblak (Slovenia)
Oliviu Craznic (Romania)
Rod Rees (UK)
Lucia Droppova (Slovakia)
Jan "Johnak" Kotouč (Czech Republic)

2013: Kyiv, Ukraine

2014: Dublin, Ireland 
European Grand Master

Jim Fitzpatrick – Ireland

Hall of Fame
Best Author: Wolfgang Jeschke – Germany
Best Artist: Jim Fitzpatrick – Ireland
Best Publisher: Angry Robot – United Kingdom
Best Magazine: Cosmoport – Belarus
Best Translator: Ms. Kersti Juva – Finland
Best Promoter of Science Fiction: Dave Lally – Ireland

Spirit of Dedication Awards
Artist: Alexander Prodan – Ukraine
Best Performance: Adaption of Dr. Horribles Sing-along Blog – Croatia
Best SF Website: Geek Ireland – Ireland
Best Fanzine: Darker – Russia
Best creator of children's ScienceFiction or fantasy books:
Oisín McGann* – Ireland
Vladimir Arenev* – Ukraine
*A tie occurred and both creators are awarded

Encouragement Awards
Marco Rauch – Austria
Victor Martinovich – Belarus
Genoveva Detelinova – Bulgaria
Irena Hartmann – Croatia
Míla Linc – Czech Republic
Anthea West – Ireland
Robert M. Wegner – Poland
Rui Alex – Portugal
Eugen Cadaru – Romania
Роман Шмараков/Roman Shmarakov – Russia
Lenka Štiblaríková – Slovakia
Igor Silivra – Ukraine

The National Irish Science Fiction Film Awards (The Golden Blasters) 
The Golden Blasters are unconnected to the Eurocons and were presented because this event was combined with Ireland's own national convention.

Golden Blaster
ON/OFF; directed by Thierry Lorenzi

Silver Blaster
Steadfast Stanley; directed by John Kim

Best Script
The Borders of the Imagination; written by Benjamin A. Friedman

Best Script Honorable Mentions
Once a Hero by Neil Chase; and The Almost Dead by Stanley B. Eisenhammer

2015: Saint Petersburg, Russia

2016: Barcelona, Spain

2017: Dortmund, Germany 
Guests of honour

2018: Amiens, France 
Eurocon 2018 was hosted by Nemo 2018 from Thursday 19 to Sunday 22 July 2018.  There was a stream of programming on African Science Fiction.

Hall of Fame

 Best Author: Анна Старобинец/Anna Starobinets (Russia)
 Best Artist: Milivoj Ćeran (Croatia)
 Best Magazine: Angle mort / Blindspot (France)
 Best Publisher: Zhupansky (Ukraine)
 Best Promoter: Jukka Halme (Finland)
 Best Translator: Ylva Spångberg (Sweden)

The CHRYSALIS AWARDS

 Maksim Kutuzau (Belarus)
 Věra Mertlíková (Czech Republic)
 Nicolas Sarter (France)
 Sinéad O’Heart (Ireland)
 Daniel Timariu (Romania)
 Martin Hatala (Slovakia)
 Yaryna Katorozh (Ukraine)

Achievement Awards

 Best Work of Fiction: The House of Binding Thorns, by Aliette de Bodard (France)
 Best Work of Art: Cover of ”Junkerś i Vaililiant protiv sila tome, by Sebastijan Čamagajevac (Croatia)
 Best Fanzine: Journey Planet, issue 33 (Ireland)
 Best Internet Publication, other than a fanzine: nooSFere (France)
 Best Dramatic Presentation: Valerian and the City of a Thousand Planets (France)
 Best Work for Children, tie: Das Sagenbuch zum Stephansdom, by Barbara Schinko (Austria) / Moj brat živi u kompjuteru, by Branka Primorac (Croatia)

HONORARY AWARD European Grand Master:

 Gerard Klein (France)

2019: Belfast, Northern Ireland 
Eurocon 2019 was hosted by TitanCon Belfast from Thursday 22 to Saturday 24 August 2019.  This was the weekend after Worldcon in Dublin.

2020: Rijeka, Croatia 
Eurocon 2020 was hosted by Rikon from Friday 2 to Sunday 4 October 2020. Due to the global COVID-19 pandemic, the event program was recorded in the studio in Rijeka, and broadcast live over the Internet for all registered participants. ač.

European Grandmaster

Franz Rottensteiner, Austria

Hall of Fame

 Best Artist: Sergey Shikin / Сергей Шикин (Russia)
 Best Author: Milena Benini (Croatia)
 Best Publisher: L’Atalante (France)
 Best Promoter: Cristina Jurado (Spain)
 Best Magazine: Esensja (Poland)
 Best Translator: Pilar Ramírez Tello (Spain)

Achievement Awards

 Best Work of Art: The Dublin 2019 Hugo Award bases (Ireland)
 Best Written Work of Fiction: Luna: Moon Rising (Luna #3) by Ian McDonald (United Kingdom)
 Best Dramatic Presentation: Good Omens (United Kingdom)
 Best Fanzine: Journey Planet – A Half Pint of Flann (Ireland)
 Best Work for Children: The Invasion by Peadar Ó Guilín (Ireland)
 Best Internet Publication (tie): The Irish Fandom Community Group on Facebook (Ireland), Fantascientificast (Italy)

Chrysalis Awards

 Caroline Hofstätter (Austria)
 Zoe Penn (Croatia)
 Edmund Schluessel (Finland)
 Chloé Veillard (France)
 Oein DeBhairduin (Ireland)
 Linda De Santi (Italy)
 Jean Bürlesk (Luxembourg)
 Diana Alzner (Romania)
 Olga Rejn / Ольга Рэйн (Russia)
 Haizea Zubieta (Spain)

2021: Fiuggi, Italy 
Eurocon 2021 was hosted in Italy by DeepCon from Thursday 15 July to Sunday 18 July 2021.

2022: Dudelange, Luxembourg 
Eurocon 2022 was hosted by Luxcon from Thursday-Sunday 7-10 April 2022 (inclusive) in Dudelange, Luxembourg.

2023: Uppsala, Sweden 
Eurocon 2023 will be known as Konflikt and will be hosted from 8-11 June 2023 in Uppsala, Sweden.

2024: Rotterdam, Netherlands 
Eurocon 2024 will be Erasmuscon in Rotterdam, Netherlands in August 2024.

Notes 
 1985: There is info that 1985 Eurocon was to be held in Riga, Latvia, USSR, but was canceled.
 1992: Was to have been Zagreb, but war in Croatia required a change of venue.
 1998: There was no Eurocon this year, although there was a Euroconference in Croatia.

References

External links 
European Science Fiction Society

Science fiction conventions in Europe
Science fiction awards
Fantasy awards
Awards established in 1972